Din Nawab (born 23 October 1935) is a Pakistani wrestler. He competed in the men's freestyle flyweight at the 1960 Summer Olympics.

References

External links
 

1935 births
Living people
Pakistani male sport wrestlers
Olympic wrestlers of Pakistan
Wrestlers at the 1960 Summer Olympics
Sportspeople from Lahore
20th-century Pakistani people